Fahu Fiyavalhu is a 2002 Maldivian television drama series developed for Television Maldives by Abdul Faththaah. The series stars Koyya Hassan Manik, Mohamed Manik, Hassan Afeef and Sheela Najeeb in pivotal roles.

Cast

Main
 Koyya Hassan Manik as Ramiz Abdul Satthar
 Mohamed Manik as Ishaq Ramiz
 Hassan Afeef as Shiyam Ibrahim
 Sheela Najeeb as Yumna Easa
 Fathimath Sazna as Mariyam Reemaz
 Zabeeru as Siraj
 Sheereen Abdul Wahid as Mizna Mohamed

Recurring
 Mariyam Shakeela as Rahma
 Haajara Abdul Kareem as Sihthi Dhaleyka
 Mohamed Yoosuf as Yahya Adam
 Ahmed Ziya as Firaq
 Chilhiya Moosa Manik as Mizna's teacher

Guest
 Waleedha Waleed as Zuhudha
 Ismail Zahir
 Naeem as a well-wisher
 Ibrahim Rasheed as Mohamed Zahir

Episodes

Soundtrack

References

Serial drama television series
Maldivian television shows